The Iron Fort is a former fort in Ren'ai Village, Nangan Township, Lienchiang County, Taiwan.

History
The fort was originally constructed as the training base for the amphibious forces.

Architecture
The fort was constructed at the southern coast of Nangan Island on an offshore rock. The middle of the rock was excavated to form a tunnel which houses various military equipment and accommodation facilities. The granite building is painted with camouflage paint.

See also
 List of tourist attractions in Taiwan

References

Forts in Lienchiang County